Edward Brown (January 1837 – 1900) was an Australian cricketer. He played one first-class match for New South Wales in 1859/60.

See also
 List of New South Wales representative cricketers

References

External links
 

1837 births
1900 deaths
Australian cricketers
New South Wales cricketers
People from Uppingham